Strand station may refer to:
Strand Station, a former railway station in Bærum, Norway
The Strand Station, a railway station in Auckland, New Zealand
Aldwych tube station, a former Underground station in London, England, named Strand until 1915
Charing Cross tube station, an Underground station in London, England, named Strand from 1915 to 1973

See also
Almere Strand railway station, a former railway station in Almere, Netherlands
Amager Strand Station, a metro station in Copenhagen, Denmark
Barrow-in-Furness Strand railway station, in Barrow-in-Furness, England
Bootle New Strand railway station, in Merseyside, England, sometimes called New Strand station
Brøndby Strand station, an S-train station in Copenhagen, Denmark
Farsta strand metro station, in Stockholm, Sweden
Farsta strand railway station, a commuter rail station in Stockholm, Sweden
Gammel Strand Station, a metro station in Copenhagen, Denmark
Hässelby strand metro station, in Stockholm, Sweden
Hoek van Holland Strand metro station, a rapid transit station outside of Rotterdam, Netherlands
Lübeck-Travemünde Strand station, in Travemünde, Germany
Rosslare Strand railway station, in County Wexford, Ireland
Solna strand metro station, in Stockholm, Sweden
Solrød Strand station, an S-train station in Copenhagen, Denmark
Strand (disambiguation)